Pseudohydrosme is a genus of flowering plants in the family Araceae. It contains only two species, Pseudohydrosme buettneri and Pseudohydrosme gabunensis, both endemic to tropical rain forests in Gabon. The genus is believed to be closely related to Anchomanes and is likely to be sunk into Anchomanes due to molecular evidence.

References

Aroideae
Araceae genera
Endemic flora of Gabon